James Linton Deen Jr. (born June 29, 1967) is an American cook, restaurateur, and TV personality.

He is the first and oldest son of culinary celebrity Paula Deen. with his younger brother, Bobby, he runs her restaurant, The Lady & Sons, in Savannah, Georgia. Deen also frequently appears on his mother's show, Paula's Home Cooking. He and his brother had their own program, Road Tasted, starting on July 11, 2006. The Deen brothers eventually decided that they wanted to devote more time to their family restaurant, and thus did not continue on as hosts of "Road Tasted." The original show has since changed to "Road Tasted with the Neelys" featuring the Food Network hosts Pat and Gina Neely.

References

External links
 

American male chefs
1967 births
Living people
American television chefs